John Alfred McDowell (born 7 September 1951) is an English former footballer who played in the Football League for West Ham United and Norwich City.

McDowell played for West Ham United as a youth. He made a single appearance for the England Youth team and went on to make 13 international appearances at under-23 level between 1972 and 1974.

He was a first-team regular for West Ham for ten years, missing only the 1976–77 season due to injury. He played as a defender, replacing Billy Bonds as right-back after the latter had switched to midfield. He made his league debut in October 1970 against Blackpool.

McDowell joined Norwich City in August 1979 for around £90,000, making his debut in a 4–2 win at Everton on 18 August 1979. He made 45 appearances for the club, scoring one goal. He joined the staff at Norwich in August 1981, coaching the reserve team, but left in May 1982 to become assistant manager at Bristol Rovers.

References

External links
John McDowell at westhamstats.info

1951 births
Living people
Footballers from East Ham
English footballers
Association football fullbacks
West Ham United F.C. players
Norwich City F.C. players
England under-23 international footballers
England youth international footballers
English Football League players
Norwich City F.C. non-playing staff
Bristol Rovers F.C. non-playing staff
English football managers
FA Cup Final players